Hermathena is a biannual peer-reviewed academic journal of the classical world published by Trinity College Dublin, under the auspices of the Department of Classics in the School of Histories and Humanities. It was established in 1873 and is now one of the longest-running classical journals in the world.

The founder of the journal was Robert Yelverton Tyrrell (1844-1914). He was the first editor-in-chief.

Since 2012 the editor-in-chief is professor Monica Gale.

References

External links
 
 Hidden Gems of the JSTOR Archive: Hermathena. Alexandra Frank, JSTOR Daily, 3 November 2014. Retrieved 26 July 2016.
 Hermathena, hathitrust.org

1873 establishments in Ireland
Biannual journals
English-language journals
Classics journals
Publications established in 1873
Trinity College Dublin